Michele Abruzzo (29 December 1904 – 17 November 1996) was an Italian actor.

Life and career 
Born in Sciacca, Abbruzzo made his debut on stage at 12 years old. Often regarded as the successor of Angelo Musco, he formed his first stage company in 1938 with Rosina Anselmi and the same year he got his first lead role in cinema in Mario Mattoli's A Lady Did It. In 1958 he was one of the founders of the Teatro Stabile in Catania. He announced his retirement in 1979, then he came back on stage in 1989, aged 85.

Filmography

References

External links
 

1904 births
1996 deaths
People from Sciacca
Italian male film actors
20th-century Italian male actors
Actors from Sicily